The 2016 Northern European Gymnastics Championships was an artistic gymnastics competition held in the city of Trondheim in Norway. The event was held between 22 and 23 October.

Medalists

References

Northern European Gymnastics Championships
2016 in gymnastics
2016 in Norwegian sport